The 12th Dallas–Fort Worth Film Critics Association Awards, given by the Dallas-Fort Worth Film Critics Association on December 19, 2006, honored the best in film for 2006. The organization, founded in 1990, includes 35 film critics for print, radio, television, and internet publications based in north Texas.

Top 10 films
 United 93
 The Departed (Academy Award for Best Picture)
 Little Miss Sunshine
 The Queen
 Babel
 Letters from Iwo Jima
 Dreamgirls
 Blood Diamond
 Little Children
 Flags of Our Fathers

Winners

Best Actor: 
Forest Whitaker – The Last King of Scotland 
Best Actress: 
Helen Mirren – The Queen
Best Animated Film: 
Happy Feet
Best Cinematography: 
Apocalypto – Dean Semler
Best Director: 
Martin Scorsese – The Departed
Best Documentary Film: 
An Inconvenient Truth
Best Film: 
United 93
Best Foreign Language Film: 
Letters from Iwo Jima, United States/Japan
Best Supporting Actor: 
Jackie Earle Haley – Little Children
Best Supporting Actress:
Cate Blanchett – Notes on a Scandal

References

External links
Dallas-Fort Worth Film Critics Association official website

2006
2006 film awards